Tobin Cornelius Rote (January 18, 1928 – June 27, 2000) was an American football player who played quarterback for the Green Bay Packers and Detroit Lions of the National Football League (NFL), the Toronto Argonauts of the Canadian Football League (CFL), and the San Diego Chargers and Denver Broncos of the American Football League (AFL).

Early life
Born in San Antonio, to William Pemberton Rote, Jr. (1891–1950) and Augusta Marie (Tietschert) Rote (1896–1969). Rote attended Harlandale High School in San Antonio and graduated in 1946.  He was named "most athletic boy" by his classmates.

He is the cousin of former New York Giants receiver and sportscaster Kyle Rote, sharing paternal grandparents.

College career
Rote played college football at Rice Institute in Houston, quarterbacking the Owls under head coach Jess Neely. As a senior in 1949, Rote led the Owls to a 10–1 season, capped by a 27–13 win over North Carolina in the Cotton Bowl in Dallas on January 2.

During the fourth game of the season in mid-October against rival SMU (that featured cousin Kyle Rote), he led the Owls back from a 14–0 deficit to a 41–27 win at the Cotton Bowl. The next week saw Rote lead a comeback against Texas, turning a 9–0 halftime deficit into a 17–15 win at Austin. With a flawless conference record, the Owls were outright Southwest Conference champions for the third time.

Professional career

Green Bay Packers
The Green Bay Packers selected Rote in the second round of the 1950 NFL draft, the 17th overall pick.  He spent a total of seven seasons in Green Bay under head coaches Gene Ronzani and Lisle Blackbourn, leading the hapless Packers' offense while the defense annually ranked among the league's worst.  Besides his passing duties, Rote led the Packers in rushing yards three times and rushing touchdowns five times.  During the span of his Green Bay career, Rote ranked third in the NFL in passing touchdowns, trailing only Bobby Layne and Norm Van Brocklin.  He also ranked first in the league in rushing yards by a quarterback and second in touchdowns.

1956 season
Rote's 1956 season ranks among the greatest in NFL history.  On a 4–8 team, he led the league in passing yards (by 294) and passing touchdowns (18 to Ted Marchibroda's 12).  In addition, his 11 rushing touchdowns were second in the league behind only those of Chicago Bears' Rick Casares.  His 29 total touchdowns were the highest single-season total in NFL history until eclipsed by LaDainian Tomlinson in 2006 (31) and the highest total in the era of the twelve-game schedule.  The entire Packers' offense outside of Rote accounted for just five touchdowns.

Among quarterbacks, he led the league in pass completions, pass attempts, passing yards, passing touchdowns, rushing attempts, rushing yards, and rushing touchdowns.

Detroit Lions
In late July 1957, Rote and defensive back Val Joe Walker were traded to the Detroit Lions for four players (halfback Don McIlhenny, offensive tackles Ollie Spencer and Norm Masters, and offensive guard Jim Salsbury).

Rote split time in 1957 with hall of famer Bobby Layne, although it was Rote who ended up with more passing touchdowns, fewer interceptions, more rushing yards, more rushing touchdowns, and a better won-lost record as a starter.  Layne broke his ankle midway through the eleventh game, leaving Rote to guide the team to an NFL title.  Detroit tied San Francisco for the division title, forcing a one-game playoff.  Facing a 27–7 deficit in the third quarter, Rote led the Lions to a 31–27 comeback win and a date with the Cleveland Browns.  In one of the greatest playoff performances in history, Rote led Detroit to a 59–14 thumping of the Browns. He completed 12 of 19 passes for 280 yards and 4 touchdowns, adding another touchdown on the ground.

As for the 1957 Green Bay Packers, they averaged four points per game fewer than the year before in spite of the addition of future hall of famers Bart Starr and Paul Hornung. Fourth-year head coach Blackbourn was replaced with Scooter McLean for 1958, the Packers' worst-ever season.

Layne was traded to the Pittsburgh Steelers after the second game of the 1958 season, leaving Rote to guide the aging and rapidly declining Lions.  Rote led the team in rushing, making it the fourth time in his career that he did so (an NFL record for quarterbacks).  After a disastrous 1959 season (3–8–1), the Lions informed Rote that he would be released. Rather than retire, the ten-year veteran headed north of the border to the Toronto Argonauts of the Canadian Football League (CFL).

Toronto Argonauts
Rote's three seasons in the Canadian Football League with the Toronto Argonauts were quite eventful. He completed 662 of 1,187 passes for 9,872 yards and 62 TDs. His 38 TD passes in 1960 was an all-time CFL record. In Rote's first season with the Argos he became the CFL's second quarterback to exceed 4,000 yards passing in a season with 4,247. He also threw 38 touchdowns that season which was then a league record. Thanks to Rote's leadership the 10–4 Argonauts in 1960 accomplished something they had not done since 1937: finish in first place. However, they lost the conference final series to Ottawa Rough Riders who went on to win the Grey Cup. Rote's 108 yard pass to Jim Rountree in 1961 is still a team record, and in 1960 he threw seven touchdown passes in a game twice, a CFL record at the time.   After the 1962 season, the Argonauts traded for future hall-of-fame QB Jackie Parker and Rote moved to the fledgling AFL.

CFL Career passing statistics

San Diego Chargers
Looking for a quarterback to lead the team in 1963 while a young John Hadl developed, the San Diego Chargers of the American Football League (AFL) came calling.  Rote was in his 14th pro season at age 35, but led the Chargers to an 11–3 record and the Western division title.  For his part in directing the league's top offense, Rote was named first-team All-AFL and captured the Associated Press Player of the Year award.  Proving that his 1957 NFL title performance was no fluke, he led the Chargers to a 51–10 win over the Boston Patriots in the 1963 AFL championship game. Individually, he accounted for 173 yards and 2 touchdowns on 10/15 passing, plus another 15 rushing yards and a touchdown on the ground.

In 1964, Hadl began receiving more playing time.  The Chargers won the West again but with an 8–5–1 record, and the offense fell from first in the AFL to fourth; and lost three of four to finish the regular season. Rote was the starter for the AFL championship game on the road against the Buffalo Bills, but neither he nor Hadl could do much against the swarming defense without Hall of Fame receiver Lance Alworth (knee hyperextension) and running back Keith Lincoln, injured in the first quarter with a broken rib.  Buffalo won 20–7, and Rote announced his retirement.

Denver Broncos
In 1966, Rote briefly came out of retirement to play for the Denver Broncos. Signed in late September after the winless Broncos lost their third game, he appeared in three games for a total of five minutes, completing three of eight passes; he was waived by the team after three games in mid-October.

Single-season milestones
 Led the NFL in rushing yards by a quarterback six times (1951, 1954–58)
 Led the NFL in passing yards once (1956)
 Led the NFL in passing touchdowns twice (1955 and 1956)

Career milestones
 Rote was the only quarterback to lead his team to both an NFL and AFL championship.
 At the time he retired, Rote had more rushing yards than any quarterback in NFL history.  He currently ranks seventh all-time.
 Rote's 21.0 yards/game rushing average is seventh all-time among quarterbacks with at least 2,000 career passes.
 Rote's 37 career rushing touchdowns ranks sixth all-time among quarterbacks.
 Rote is one of two quarterbacks to lead his team in rushing four times.

In 2005, he was named to the Professional Football Researchers Association Hall of Very Good in the association's third HOVG class.

Death
Rote died at age 72 in Saginaw, Michigan from a heart attack on June 27, 2000. In his last 18 months, he had undergone open heart surgery and back surgery. He was survived by wife Julie, former wife Betsy Todd and children Tobin Jr, Robin, Toni and Rock.

See also
List of American Football League players

References

External links
 

1928 births
2000 deaths
American football quarterbacks
American players of Canadian football
Canadian football quarterbacks
Denver Broncos (AFL) players
Detroit Lions players
Green Bay Packers players
Rice Owls football players
San Diego Chargers players
Toronto Argonauts players
American Football League All-Star players
American Football League Most Valuable Players
Western Conference Pro Bowl players
Harlandale High School alumni
Players of American football from San Antonio
Players of Canadian football from San Antonio
American Football League players